The following Union Army units and commanders fought in the Second Battle of Deep Bottom (Aug 13-20, 1864) during the Petersburg campaign of the American Civil War. Order of battle is compiled from the official tabulation of casualties and includes only units which sustained casualties.

Abbreviations

Rank
 MG = Major General
 BG = Brigadier General
 Col = Colonel
 Ltc = Lieutenant Colonel
 Maj = Major
 Cpt = Captain

Army of the Potomac

II Corps

MG Winfield S. Hancock

Army of the James

X Corps

MG David B. Birney

References

American Civil War orders of battle